Kaura Duba (died 26 February 1969) was a Papua New Guinean politician. He served as a member of the House of Assembly from 1968 until his death the following year.

Biography
Married with one child, Duba worked as an interpreter and had a coffee farm. He was elected to the council of Jimi Rural LLG.

Duba contested the Jimi open constituency in the February– March 1968 elections, and was elected to the House of Assembly. However, he died in February the following year.

References

Papua New Guinean farmers
Members of the House of Assembly of Papua and New Guinea
1969 deaths